When the Music Stops may refer to:

 When the Music Stops (dating service), a dating franchise operating in the United Kingdom
 When the Music Stops, an album by Daryl Coley
 "When the Music Stops", a song by Eminem from the album The Eminem Show
 "When the Music Stops", a 1973 song by Roger Daltrey from Daltrey